Garu Block is one of the administrative  blocks of Latehar district, Jharkhand state, India.

Latehar district
Community development blocks in Jharkhand
Community development blocks in Latehar district
Cities and towns in Latehar district